Nipster is a slang term used in Germany and the U.K. to refer to young neo-Nazis who have embraced aspects of hipster culture. Historically, German neo-Nazis promoted an ultra-masculine and extreme right-wing image, preferring short hair, violent imagery and combat gear—in keeping with the white power skinhead or casual subcultures—while rejecting most modern pop culture. This has changed, with young "" embracing causes such as animal rights and environmentalism alongside historically far right positions, including anti-immigration views. Nipsters, rather than rejecting modern pop culture, seek instead to appropriate it to promote neo-Nazi ideals. This has also been seen in the New Right and National Anarchism movements. 

Rolling Stone magazine profiled Patrick Schroeder, one of the founders of the nipster movement, who said he desires to "give the German National Socialist movement a friendlier, hipper face". Schroeder says that neo-Nazis who can "live within the mainstream", such as nipsters, are "the future of the movement". Social networking websites like Tumblr frequently host nipster content. A video showing a young neo-Nazi dancing to the Harlem Shake gained over 17,000 views on YouTube between 2013 and 2014. There are also German neo-Nazi hip-hop and reggae bands.

Usage of term outside Germany

United Kingdom 
British neo-Nazi terrorist organisation National Action was said to have been a "mixture of hipsters and skinheads" prior to being proscribed. The National described the group as consisting of mostly middle-class, hipster fascists.

Other uses of the term
In 2011, three students founded the German online magazine Nipster, using the neologism to depict hipsters in the town of Nuremberg, not neo-Nazi hipsters. The online magazine has since folded.

See also
 Autonome Nationalisten
 Culture jamming
 Ecofascism
 Hipster racism
 Jihad Cool
 Nazi punk
 Nazism
 Neo-fascism
 Pegida
 Thor Steinar
 Brenton Tarrant

References

External links
The hipster fascists trying to bring Mussolini back into the mainstream on YouTube
The 'Nipsters': NPD and neo-Nazis change their style

Alt-right
Neo-Nazism in Germany
Hipster (contemporary subculture)